Andrei Semyonov (born 22 May 1957) is a former Russian football player.

References

1957 births
Living people
Soviet footballers
FC Zvezda Irkutsk players
FC Okean Nakhodka players
Russian footballers
Russian Premier League players
Place of birth missing (living people)

Association football goalkeepers